Zagăr is a commune in Mureș County, Transylvania, Romania that is composed of two villages, Seleuș (Klein-Alisch; Szászszőllős) and Zagăr. As of 2002 Zagăr had a population of 1,208 consisting of 60% Romanians, 35% Roma, 3% Hungarians and 2% Germans.

References

Communes in Mureș County
Localities in Transylvania